Aurelian Eusebio Păun (born 5 May 2001) is a Romanian professional footballer who plays as a goalkeeper for Liga I club Universitatea Cluj.

References

External links
 
 

2001 births
Living people
Sportspeople from Pitești
Romanian footballers
Association football goalkeepers
Liga I players
Liga II players
AFC Turris-Oltul Turnu Măgurele players
LPS HD Clinceni players
FC Universitatea Cluj players